Henry "Hank" Wilkins IV (born December 13, 1954, in Pine Bluff, Arkansas) is an American politician and a Democratic former member of the Arkansas House of Representatives. He represented District 17 from January 2011 to 2015. Wilkins was consecutively a member of the Arkansas General Assembly from January 2001 until January 2011 in the Arkansas Senate in the District 5 and 8 seats, and from January 1999 until January 2001 in the state House of Representatives.

Education
Wilkins earned his Bachelor of Arts from the University of Michigan in Ann Arbor, his M.Div. from the St. Paul Seminary in Kansas City, Missouri,  his Ph.D. from Philander Smith College, and his Doctor of Laws from The University of Arkansas System.

Elections
2012 Wilkins was unopposed for both the May 22, 2012 Democratic Primary and the November 6, 2012 General election.
1998 Wilkins was initially elected to the Arkansas House of Representatives in the 1998 Democratic Primary and the November 3, 1998 General election.
2000 When the Senate District 8 seat was open, Wilkins ran in the 2000 Democratic Primary and won, and was unopposed for the November 7, 2000 General election.
2002 Redistricted to District 5, Wilkins was unopposed for the 2002 Democratic Primary, and won the November 5, 2002 General election against Independent candidate Jimmie Wilson.
2006 Wilkins was challenged in the 2006 Democratic Primary, but won, and was unopposed for the November 7, 2006 General election.
2010 When House District 17 Representative Stephanie Flowers ran for Arkansas Senate and left the seat open, Wilkins ran for the District 17 House seat and was unopposed for both the May 18, 2010 Democratic Primary and the November 2, 2010 General election.

Conviction
Wilkins pled guilty to conspiracy in 2017 for accepting $80,000 in bribes in exchange for influencing state legislation.

See also
List of first minority male lawyers and judges in Arkansas

References

External links
Official page  at the Arkansas House of Representatives

Hank Wilkins at Ballotpedia
Henry (Hank) Wilkins IV at OpenSecrets

1954 births
Living people
African-American state legislators in Arkansas
Democratic Party Arkansas state senators
Democratic Party members of the Arkansas House of Representatives
Politicians from Pine Bluff, Arkansas
Philander Smith College alumni
University of Michigan alumni
21st-century African-American people
20th-century African-American people